Chazara egina, the Anatolian witch, is a butterfly species belonging to the family Nymphalidae. It can be found in Turkey and Iran.

The wingspan is 45–60 mm. The butterflies fly from mid-July to mid-August depending on the location.

External links
 Satyrinae of the Western Palearctic - Chazara egina
 The Butterflies Monitoring & Photography Society of Turkey

egina
Butterflies described in 1892
Butterflies of Asia